The Department of the Interior was an Australian government department that existed between April 1932 and April 1939. It was the first so-named Australian Government department to be created, and was replaced by the Department of the Interior (II).

Scope
Information about the department's functions and/or government funding allocation could be found in the Administrative Arrangements Orders, the annual Portfolio Budget Statements and in the Department's annual reports.

The Department was a composite department and dealt with a diverse range of activities. According to National Archives of Australia records, at its creation the Department dealt with:
Aliens Registration
Astronomy
Australian War Memorial
Commonwealth Literary Fund
Conveyance of Members of Parliament and others
Co-ordination of Australian Transport Services
Elections and Franchise
Emigration of children and aboriginals
Federal Transport Council
Forestry
Geodesy
Immigration
Indentured Coloured Labour
Lands and Survey
Meteorology
Naturalization
Northern Territory
Oil Investigation and Prospecting (Encouragement of)
Passports
Pearl Shelling and Trepang Fisheries in Australian waters beyond Territorial Limits
Properties (a) transferred (b) acquired (c) rented
Prospecting for precious metals (assistance for)
Public Works and Services
Railways
Rivers, roads and bridges
Seat of Government
Solar Observatory
War Service Homes
Waterside employment

Structure
The Department was a Commonwealth Public Service department, staffed by officials who were responsible to the Minister for the Interior.

Notes

References and further reading

Interior
1932 establishments in Australia
1939 disestablishments in Australia